"Germ Warfare" was the 11th episode of the first season of the TV series M*A*S*H. It originally aired on December 10, 1972.

Guest cast is Patrick Adiarte as Ho-Jon, Timothy Brown as Spearchucker Jones, Byron Chung as P.O.W., Odessa Cleveland as Ginger, Bob Gooden as Boone, and Karen Philipp as Lt. Dish.  The episode features the final appearances in the series of Captain Jones, Lt. Dish and Pvt. Boone—all simply disappear after this point, without comment or explanation.

Overview
Hawkeye and Trapper move a North Korean POW patient into the Swamp, rather than have him shipped out early. Discovering that he and Frank share the same rare blood type, they take a pint of Frank's blood while he sleeps. However, when the patient develops hepatitis, they suspect Frank is the carrier, and have to keep him away from Margaret and patients. Instead of taking another blood sample from Frank for testing, they trick him into drinking so much beer that he needs to urinate, then block off the officers' latrine and direct him to a temporary one set up as a bucket in a tent. After sending the full bucket to a lab, Hawkeye and Trapper enlist an MP to physically restrain Frank from performing any surgery. They relent only when the urine test results prove negative for hepatitis, vindicating Frank's claim that the POW had been in the early stages of the disease when he arrived in the camp. As an apology for not being honest with Frank, Hawkeye gives him a bouquet of daisies.

In the course of the episode, Margaret and Frank set up a rendezvous. Alan Alda does a very respectable imitation of Pete Smith, the MGM Studios short subject humorist famed for his "Pete Smith Specialties", describing their behavior and actions as the lovers go about their shenanigans.

Notes

External links

M*A*S*H (season 1) episodes
1972 American television episodes